The Portuguese Albums Chart ranks the best-performing albums in Portugal, as compiled by the Associação Fonográfica Portuguesa.

References 

Portugal
2009 in Portugal
Portuguese record charts